Herek is a surname. Notable people with the surname include:

Gregory M. Herek (born 1954), American psychologist and writer
Stephen Herek (born 1958), American film director

See also
Derek (surname)